Viktor Klishin (born 15 October 1982 ) is an Uzbek footballer who plays as a forward for Qizilqum Zarafshon.

Career
Klishin started playing professionally for Dustlik in 2000. He completed 4 seasons for Dustlik. After this he moved 2003 FK Riga in 2003. He played for several Oliy League clubs such as Navbahor Namangan, Andijan and Dinamo Samarqand. From 2006 to 2008 he played for Mash'al Mubarek. At the end of the 2007 Oliy League season he was top goalscorer of Mash'al with 14 goals.  After playing the 2009-2010 season for FK Andijan he moved to Shurtan Guzar to play the second half of the season. On 18 August 2010 he played in the Uzbek Cup final against Bunyodkor, but Shurtan lost 0-1.

In 2013, he joined Mash'al again. With 11 goals he was the 2nd best club goalscorer after Zokhir Kuziboyev and made a significant contribution to his club's promotion to the top division. A year later, in February 2014, he moved back to Shurtan Guzar. During the 2014 season he played for Shurtan Guzar in the First League. On 5 May 2014 he made first appearance of the season in a home match against FK Zaamin which ended in a 5-0 victory. After the 2014 First League Klishin 1st round of games he was the best goal scoring player with 28 goals. At the end of 2014 First League season Klishin became the best League goalscorer with 40 goals, making his contribution to Shurtan Guzars promotion to the 2015 Uzbek League as 2014 First League champions.

He completed 13 matches for Shurtan in the 2015 Uzbek League. In July 2015, halfway through the season, he left Shurtan and moved to Qizilqum Zarafshon.

International
He made his debut for the national team on 8 October 2007 and made his second appearance in a 2010 FIFA World Cup qualifying match against Chinese Taipei in Taipei. Klishin has been capped in 2 matches for the national team.

Honours

Club
Dustlik
 Uzbek League (1): 2000
 Uzbek Cup (1): 2000

Mash'al
 Uzbek Cup runners-up: 2006
 Uzbekistan First League (1): 2013

Shurtan
 Uzbek Cup runners-up: 2010
 Uzbekistan First League (1): 2014

Individual
 Uzbekistan First League Topscorer: 2014 (40 goals)
 Mash'al League Topscorer: 2007 (14 goals)

References

External links

Viktor Klishin statistics

Uzbekistani footballers
1982 births
Living people
Uzbekistani people of Russian descent
Association football forwards
Uzbekistan Super League players
Latvian Higher League players
FK Mash'al Mubarek players
Expatriate footballers in Latvia
Uzbekistan international footballers